Aatadista is a 2008 Indian Telugu-language romantic action comedy film, starring Nithiin, Kajal Aggarwal, Raghuvaran, Jayasudha, Nagababu and others. Directed by A. S. Ravi Kumar Chowdary, it was produced by C. Kalyan and S. Vijayanand, and scored by Chakri. This film is notable as actor Raghuvaran's last movie.

The film was released on 20 March 2008 to mixed reviews. The film was later dubbed and released in Hindi as Daring Gundaraaj in 2013 and in Bengali as Tumi Amar Mon Bojhona in 2010.

Plot
Jagan, alias Chinna is industrialist Lion Rajendra's jobless son. He falls in love with Sunanda. Meanwhile, he suggests that his father and his rival Raghunath get into a partnership to double up their efficiency. Without his knowledge, his marriage is fixed to Raghunath's daughter, who obviously turns out to be Sunanda, but the families are not on great terms even after they fix the match. Raghunath is dealing in tobacco businesses that is actually owned by Bonala Shankar, a brusque and notorious MLA. Rajendra doesn't want to deal in that area, but Bonala threatens the board of directors too. Now Jagan has to deal with this corrupt politico and plays a game with him that shakes him from his very roots - spreads a rumor that he hit Shankar.

Cast

Nithin as Jagan "Chinna"
Kajal Aggarwal as Sunanda
Raghuvaran as Raghunath
Nagababu as Lion Rajendra
Jayasudha as Jagan's mother
Jayalalita as Raghunath's wife
Narsing Yadav as Narsing, Bonala Shankar's henchman
Ravi Prakash as Jagan's elder brother
Chalapathi Rao
Narra Venkateswara Rao
Sivaprasad as Bonala Shankar
Amit Tiwari as Bonala Shankar's son
Venu Madhav as Mama
Babu Mohan as Bonala Shankar's brother-in-law
Raghunatha Reddy as Party Leader
Chinna as C. I.
Allari Subhashini as Bonala Shankar's wife
Ananth Babu as Lion Rajendra's PA
Mumaith Khan as item number

Soundtrack

Reception 
The Hindu opined that "The script meanders and strangely it's a villain's show all the way!".

References

External links
 

2000s Telugu-language films
2008 films
Films scored by Chakri